Hearst is a town in the district of Cochrane, Ontario, Canada. At Hearst, Highway 583 extends northward to Lac-Sainte-Thérèse and southward to Jogues, Coppell and Mead. Just over 96% of the town's residents speak French as their mother language, the highest proportion in Ontario.

History

The town was established as a divisional point of the National Transcontinental Railway in 1913, 208 km west of Cochrane and 201 km east of the divisional point of Grant. There is some indeterminacy with the name Grant as the original site of Hearst was also called Grant and was changed to Hearst in 1911.

Hearst was named to honour William Howard Hearst, then Ontario Minister of Forests and Mines and later Premier of Ontario. It was incorporated in 1922. Many settlers to the town originally came from the province of Quebec. Many also came from Europe and other regions in Canada and the USA.

Demographics 

Economy

Hearst has a long tradition of being a "lumber town".  Currently the major employers include a Tembec hardwood and softwood facility as well as a plywood mill operated by Columbia Forest Products.

Arts and culture
93.7% of Hearst's population is francophone.
Different cultures can be found in Hearst such as Finn, Slovak, Bulgarian, Chinese, Portuguese, Greek, Ukrainian, First Nations and also Black Canadians.

The town is home to the Université de Hearst, formerly a federated school of Laurentian University in Sudbury. The Hearst Public Library was founded on December 17, 1974.  In its beginning, the library was situated in the basement of the Hearst High School where it shared its space with the school library.  On June 4, 1984, the library moved to its present location, 801 George Street (formerly Stedman's). Hearst is a four-season destination. Many years ago, the town proclaimed itself the Moose Capital of Canada. Local outdoor activities include fishing, hunting, snowmobiling, cross-country skiing, camping, swimming, canoeing, and golf.

Infrastructure

Transportation
Hearst is served by Hearst (René Fontaine) Municipal Airport.

Hearst was the northern terminus for a Canadian National Railways-operated passenger train service from Sault Ste. Marie, Ontario, running over the tracks of the former Algoma Central Railway.
Hearst is the northern terminus for Ontario Northland's coach service.

Education

Hearst has both elementary and high schools (public and Catholic).  It also has the Université de Hearst, a post-secondary institution that was formerly federated with Laurentian University in Sudbury.  Education can also be sought at the collegiate level with the Collège Boréal.

Media

Radio
Hearst's only local radio service is provided by CINN-FM, a community radio station. All other radio stations available in the community are rebroadcasters of stations from Kapuskasing, Timmins or Sudbury.

Television

Hearst used to be served by CBCC-TV and CBLFT-TV-5, rebroadcasters of the Toronto-based CBLT-DT (CBC Television) and CBLFT-DT (Ici Radio-Canada Télé) respectively, but the transmitters were shut down in 2012 due to budget cuts at the Canadian Broadcasting Corporation.

Notable people

 Réginald Bélair, politician
 René Fontaine, politician.  Hearst (René Fontaine) Municipal Airport is named in his honour.
 Doric Germain, writer whose books centre on Franco-Ontarian heritage
 Claude Giroux, professional hockey player
 Claude Larose, professional hockey player
 Rumun Ndur, professional hockey player
 Eric Sorensen, journalist
 Pierre LeBrun, journalist

See also
List of francophone communities in Ontario
Franco-Ontarians

References

External links

Municipalities in Cochrane District
Single-tier municipalities in Ontario
Towns in Ontario